is the Japanese name for the Ural owl.

It can also refer to:
 Fukurou, a character in the manga Damekko Dōbutsu
 Fukurou, a character from the anime and manga One Piece
 Fukurou, a character in the manga Usogui
 Fukurou, alias used by the character Eren Kruger from the anime and manga Attack on Titan
 Fukurou Nezire, a character in the Super Sentai series Denji Sentai Megaranger
 Fukurou Tsurubami, a character in the manga Medaka Box
 Fukurou, a song by Plastic Tree on their album Dona Dona